Beijing University of Civil Engineering and Architecture is a university in Beijing. Established in 1936, it is maintained by the Beijing municipal government.

History 
The university was founded during the Qing Dynasty in 1907 when it was firstly named Jingshi (Peking) Elementary Industrial School. The school changed its name in 1933 to Beiping Municipal Senior Vocational School before the Civil Engineering Division was established in 1936. Approved by the State Council in 1977, the school became the public university and as the first university in Beijing who resumed the bachelor's degree courses, it was renamed as Beijing College of Construction and Engineering. In 1982, the college was identified as the first batch of the national bachelor's degree-granting college followed by the national master's degree-granting universities in 1986 and the university was renamed as the Beijing University of Architecture and Engineering. In 2011, the university joined Excellent Engineers Training Education Program hosted by Beijing Ministry of Education and in 2012, the university was approved as a doctoral talent training project to serve the special needs of the country due to Theory and Technology of Architectural Heritage Protection. Then the university was approved by the Ministry of Education to be renamed as Beijing University of Civil Engineering and Architecture in April 2013.

In 2014, it was approved to set up a post-doctoral research mobile station of "Architecture". In October 2015, the Government and the Ministry of Housing, Urban and Rural Construction signed a co-construction agreement to approve that the school officially entered the ranks of "Provincial Co-construction Universities". In May 2016, the school's "Future Urban Design Innovation Center" was approved as "Beijing Higher School Innovation Center". In 2017, it was approved to recommend outstanding undergraduate to study for postgraduate qualification without examination. In May 2018, the university became the national Doctor of Philosophy degree-granting universities and the PhD in architecture and civil engineering were approved to be the "First-level Discipline in Doctor of Philosophy degree".

Campus 
The school has two campuses in Xicheng and Daxing districts in Beijing. The Xicheng campus covers an area of 123,000 square meters, the Daxing campus covers an area of 501,000 square meters; the total school building area is 488,000 square meters. At present, the school is accelerating the construction of the two campuses in accordance with the "two high" layout goals of "building a high-quality undergraduate talent training base in Daxing Campus and building a high-level graduate training, scientific and technological collaborative innovation and achievement transformation base" in Xicheng Campus. The school library has a collection of 1.469 million paper books, 1.85 million online e-books, 77 large electronic document databases, and the China Architecture Library jointly established by the Ministry of Housing and Urban-Rural Development. It is a university with a complete range of architectural books in the country.

Academics 
The university currently has 10 colleges, School of International Education, Innovation and Entrepreneurship Education, and Continuing Education. There are 10,845 students in various colleges and schools, including 7713 full-time undergraduates, 2178 postgraduates, 56 PhD candidates, 766 continuing education students, and 132 international students.

There are 2 authorized first-level Doctor of Philosophy degrees, 1 Doctor of Philosophy project for cultivating talents serving the special needs of the country, 2 post-doctoral research mobile stations, 14 authorized first-level master's degree programs and 1 authorized cross-disciplinary master's degree program. There are 10 authorized professional master's degree. It has 3 high-precision subjects in Beijing colleges and universities (Architecture and Urban Planning, Civil and Transportation Engineering, and Geomatics and Urban Spatial Information).

The Ministry of Education's fourth round of discipline evaluation for the two disciplines of architecture and civil engineering is B. In September 2019, the schools of Engineering entered the top 1% of ESI's global ranking. There are currently 40 undergraduate courses, including 6 National first-class professional courses, 3 national-level specialty courses, 2 key first-class courses with Beijing universities, 3 Beijing-level first-class courses, and 7 Beijing-specific courses.

The school has a collection of famous teachers and a strong teaching team. The school currently has 1,060 faculty members, including 664 full-time teachers. Among the full-time teachers, there are 168 teachers with a master's degree, 458 teachers with PhD degree, 425 teachers with senior professional and technical positions, 140 professors, and 46 doctoral supervisors. There are 1 national outstanding young science fund winner, 1 national-level teaching teacher, 2 national "Ten Thousand-Year Project" leading talents, 4 national-level candidates for the 10 million talent project, 2 national excellent teachers, 3 Beijing scholars, 10 experts enjoying special government allowances, 10 members of the Higher Education Teaching Steering Committee of the Ministry of Education, 2 outstanding talents from the Beijing High-Tech Initiative, 2 selected from the "Hundred Talents Program" of the Chinese Academy of Sciences, and 1 young Beijing scholar, Three persons were selected by the Ministry of Education in the New Century Excellent Talents Program, one person is a young and middle-aged leader in science and technology from the Ministry of Science and Technology, one is one of the 100 leading talents in Beijing in science and technology, five are in the "high-creation project" in Beijing "Creative Project" 2 teaching faculty members, 8 Beijing-level candidates with 10 million engineering talents, 9 candidates for the Great Wall Scholars Training Program in Beijing, 8 teaching faculty in Beijing colleges and universities, 8 young teaching faculty in Beijing, and 8 science and technology stars in Beijing . It has 1 innovation team from the Ministry of Education, 32 top-notch youth teams from the Organization Department of Beijing Municipal Committee, academic innovation team from Beijing Municipal Education Commission, excellent teaching team and management innovation team.

The school insists on establishing a school with quality, and the education and teaching results are fruitful. In 2014, he won the first prize of the National Teaching Achievement Award and won 29 awards in the last three Beijing Teaching Achievement Awards, including 13 first prizes. It has 12 national-level undergraduate teaching engineering projects including the national-level experimental teaching demonstration centre, the national-level virtual simulation experimental teaching centre, and the national-level off-campus talent training base. In addition, there are 4 Beijing Experimental Teaching Demonstration Centers, 7 City-level Extracurricular Talent Cultivation Bases, 2 City-level Innovative Practice Bases, 1 Beijing Higher Education Institutional Talent Training Model Innovation Pilot Area, and 1 “Belt and Road” in Beijing "National Talent Training Base. In the past five years, students have won 14 national awards and 743 provincial and ministerial awards in science and cultural activities such as the "Challenge Cup" and "Creating Youth" in national and capital universities.

The school insists on the promotion of science and technology, and scientific research is fruitful. The school has always strengthened major national and regional strategies and major engineering needs, and has formed architectural heritage protection, urban and rural planning and architectural design, urban transportation infrastructure and underground engineering, sponge city construction, modern urban surveying and mapping, solid waste recycling technology, green Several characteristic subject areas, scientific research directions and innovative teams with comparative advantages across the country are represented by construction and energy-saving technologies.

Schools and Institutes 
 College of Architecture and Urban Planning
 College of Civil and Transportation Engineering
 College of Environment and Energy Engineering
 College of Electronics and Information Engineering
 College of Economics and Management Engineering
 College of Geomatics and Urban Spatial Informatics
 College of Mechanical Electronic and Vehicle Engineering
 College of Humanity and Law
 College of Mathematical Sciences
 College of Marxism
 School of International Education
 School of Innovation and Entrepreneurship Education
 College of Continuing Education
 Department of Physical Education

The school has 26 high-tech innovation centres for future urban design in Beijing, the Ministry of Education Key Laboratory of Urban Rainwater System and Water Environment, the Engineering Research Center of the Ministry of Education for Representative Buildings and Ancient Architecture Database, and the Key Laboratory of Urban Spatial Information of the Ministry of Natural Resources. Provincial and ministerial key scientific research platform.

In recent years, teachers of our school have won more than 160 scientific and technological achievement awards at the provincial and ministerial level, including 15 national science and technology awards. In 2010, 2011, and 2012, they won the second prize of the National Science and Technology Progress Award for the first consecutive three years. The second prize of National Technology Invention (the first accomplished).

In the past five years, more than 2,000 new science and technology projects have been added, including major national science and technology projects, national key research and development plan projects, key projects of the National Natural Science Foundation of China, national natural science foundation projects, major projects of the National Social Science Foundation, and national social science funds There are more than 400 provincial and ministerial-level and higher-level scientific research projects such as projects, humanities and social sciences projects of the Ministry of Education, Beijing Natural Science Foundation Projects, and Beijing Science and Technology Projects; The school attaches great importance to the transformation of scientific and technological achievements, continuously improves the ability and level of serving the society, and builds a university science and technology park with the characteristics of the construction industry. It is one of the first two universities in the Zhongguancun National Independent Innovation Demonstration Area's equity incentive reform work.

International Students 

The school insists on opening schools and extensively carries out international educational exchanges and cooperation. At present, it has established cooperative relations with 94 colleges and institutions in 42 countries and regions including the United States, France, the United Kingdom, and Russia. In October 2017, the school initiated the establishment of an international alliance of “Belt and Road” architectural universities, which has continuously deepened the “Belt and Road” initiative for the country, comprehensively promoted infrastructure construction, international talent cultivation, scientific and technological collaborative innovation and cultural exchanges along the route. Important contribution, 57 institutions from 24 countries have joined the alliance.

Notable alumni 

For more than 100 years, the school has followed the school philosophy of "making people virtuous, open and innovative" and the school spirit of "unity, diligence, pragmatism, and innovation", adhering to the school motto of "seeking truth from facts, excellence", and "patriotic dedication, perseverance, honesty and honesty". The spirit of Beijing Construction University, "Dare to be the first" has trained more than 70,000 outstanding graduates for the country. They have participated in major urban construction projects in Beijing for more than 60 years and become the backbone of the national and capital city construction system. Among the alumni, Li Ruihuan, known as the "contemporary Luban," emerged, Zheng Jianbang, vice chairman of the National Committee of the Chinese People's Political Consultative Conference, Zhao Hong, the founder of the nuclear industry base, Zhang Zaiming, an academician of the Chinese Academy of Engineering, Liu Guisheng, Shen Xiaoke, Zhang Yu, Luo Ling, Hu Yue, Bao Qiwei, Gao Shiguo, Yang Bogang, a large number of outstanding talents such as Chinese architect Ma Yansong, which has an important international influence. The employment rate of the school's graduates has remained above 95% for many years, and it entered the ranks of the “Top 50 National College Employment” in 2014.

Universities and colleges in Beijing
Educational institutions established in 1936
1936 establishments in China